Stanley Aborah may refer to:

Stanley Aborah (footballer, born 1969), Ghanaian international footballer
Stanley Aborah (footballer, born 1987), Belgian footballer of Ghanaian descent, son of the above